Keerthana is an Indian film and television actress. She handled lead roles and supporting roles during the 1990s in Tamil, Telugu and Malayalam. She entered Tamil film field through Naalaiya Theerpu in 1992, which happens to be Vijay's 1st film as a lead actor.

Partial filmography

Television

References

External links

Actresses in Malayalam cinema
Actresses in Tamil cinema
Actresses in Telugu cinema
Indian film actresses
20th-century Indian actresses
21st-century Indian actresses
Year of birth missing (living people)
Living people
Place of birth missing (living people)
Actresses in Tamil television